The French overseas department of Mayotte is divided into 17 communes.

Most are located on the island of Grande Terre, except for Dzaoudzi and Pamandzi which are located on Petite Terre.

The communes cooperate in the following intercommunalities (as of 2022):
Communauté d'agglomération de Dembeni-Mamoudzou
Communauté d'agglomération du Grand Nord de Mayotte
Communauté de communes du Centre-Ouest
Communauté de communes de Petite-Terre
Communauté de communes du Sud

List of communes

Detailed communal breakdown of population 

Same communes, classified by decreasing population (Mayotte counted 160,506 inhabitants in total in 2002, for an average population density of 430.0 inhabitants/km2, more than four times the national average). The average or mean population of the communes is 9,441 inhabitants, while the median population is 6,963 inhabitants, much higher than the average and median population of Metropolitan France (1,542 and 380 inhabitants respectively). Each commune generally consists of several villages.

See also 
 List of cities in Mayotte
 Islands of Mayotte
 Administrative divisions of France
 Lists of communes of France

References

 
Mayotte
Communes